Military Merit Cross is the name for a military decoration in various states, including:

 Military Merit Cross (Austria–Hungary) (Militärverdienstkreuz) (in three classes)
 Military Merit Cross (Czechoslovakia), awarded to Charles Paul de Cumont
 Several orders, decorations, and medals of the German Empire,  included the German States of Hesse and Waldeck 
 Military Merit Cross (Prussia) (Militär-Verdienstkreuz), also called the Golden Military Merit Cross (Goldenes Militär-Verdienstkreuz)
 Military Merit Cross (Bavaria) (Militär-Verdienstkreuz) (in three classes)
 Military Merit Cross (Mecklenburg-Schwerin) (Militärverdienstkreuz) (in two classes)

See also
 Military Merit Medal (disambiguation)
 Military Merit Order (disambiguation)
 Order of Military Merit (disambiguation)
 Military Cross of Merit

Military awards and decorations